The EO Media Group is a newspaper publishing company based in the U.S. state of Oregon. It publishes 17 newspapers in the state and in southwestern Washington.

History 
The company, which has been family-owned for four generations, was previously known as the East Oregonian Publishing Company. It is owned by the Aldrich and Forrester families, members of which previously owned several newspapers (including the East Oregonian and The Daily Astorian) independently. The connection between the East Oregonian and The Daily Astorian dates to 1909, when several East Oregonian staffers bought the Astoria Budget, which was later merged with the Astorian. In 1973, the father and son (J. W. Forrester, Jr. and Michael A. Forrester) who had been publishing the East Oregonian and the Daily Astorian switched positions.

The company acquired the Blue Mountain Eagle in 1979, the Chinook Observer in 1988, the Capital Press in 1991, The Hermiston Herald in 2008, and Seaside Signal in 2003.

In 2014, the EO Media Group partnered with the Pamplin Media Group, which publishes the Portland Tribune and 24 other weekly and monthly publications in Oregon, to form the Oregon Capital Bureau and publish the Oregon Capital Insider newsletter. The partnership came as the number of reporters assigned to state capital bureaus nationwide was on the decline. In 2018, the newly-launched Salem Reporter joined the bureau, and its publisher, Les Zaitz, was assigned to lead its three reporters. As of spring 2020, the Salem Reporter and Zaitz are no longer part of the Oregon Capital Bureau .

The Aldrich-Forrester-Bedford-Brown family, which owns the EO Media Group, was covered in the 2018 book Grit and Ink: An Oregon Family's Adventures in Newspapering, 1908–2018 by William F. Willingham. The book was published by the EO Media Group; but according to the author, it isn't an "authorized biography," and he had "wide open" ground rules. The book was to be distributed by the Oregon State University Press.

In 2019, EO Media Group acquired the Baker City Herald, The Observer (La Grande), The Bulletin (Bend) and The Redmond Spokesman from Western Communications.

Formerly owned publications 

 The North Coast Citizen in Manzanita was purchased in 2007 and sold in 2011 to Country Media Inc.

 Oregon Coast TODAY in Lincoln City was purchased in 2012 and sold in July 2020 to Patrick Alexander, who worked as the publication's editor and publisher.

Awards 
The group won a top regional award for its "Fate of Our Forests" series from the Society of Professional Journalists in 2012, in a regional group including papers under 25,000 circulation from Montana to Alaska. The same series, which ran in 2011, had previously won the Dolly Connelly Award for Excellence in Environmental Reporting from the Pacific Northwest Newspaper Association.

Newspapers

References

External links 
 Official web site

Publishing companies based in Oregon